The 1970 Italian local elections were held on 7 and 8 June. The elections were held in 6,632 municipalities and 88 provinces.

Municipal elections
Results summary of municipalities with more than 5,000 inhabitants.

Provincial elections

References

External links 	

1970 elections in Italy
 
Municipal elections in Italy
June 1970 events in Europe